Muscari is a genus of perennial bulbous plants native to Eurasia that produce spikes of dense, most commonly blue, urn-shaped flowers resembling bunches of grapes in the spring. The common name for the genus is grape hyacinth (a name which is also used for the related genera Leopoldia and Pseudomuscari, which were formerly included in Muscari), but they should not be confused with hyacinths. A number of species of Muscari are used as ornamental garden plants.

Description
The genus Muscari originated in the Old World, including the Mediterranean basin, central and Southern Europe, northern Africa, western, central and south-western Asia. It has become naturalized elsewhere, including Northern Europe and the United States.

Brian Mathew says that many species of grape hyacinths, including not only Muscari but also the related Leopoldia and Pseudomuscari, are difficult to distinguish. They usually have one or more narrow leaves which arise from a bulb. The flowers appear in the spring and form a spike or raceme, being held in a close or loose spiral around a central stalk. The flowers often become less tightly spaced as the flower matures. The flower colour varies from pale blue to a very dark blue, almost black in some cases (albino forms are also known). In some species, the upper flowers may be of a different colour and shape to the lower flowers. Individual flowers are composed of six fused tepals forming a spherical to obovoid shape, constricted at the end to form a mouth around which the ends of the tepals show as small lobes or "teeth", which may be of a different colour to the rest of the tepal.

Taxonomy
The use of muscari as part of the name of at least some of the species included in the modern genus can be traced back to Carolus Clusius in 1601, long before the modern rules of botanical nomenclature were established. In 1753, Carl Linnaeus used the name Hyacinthus muscari for the plant now called Muscari racemosum. In 1754, Philip Miller formally established the genus Muscari according to modern rules of nomenclature. The name muscari comes from the Greek , musk, referring to the scent.

Classified in the family Asparagaceae, subfamily Scilloideae, the genus was formerly placed in the Liliaceae as a member of the tribe Hyacintheae. There are about forty species. The genus was at one time divided into four groups or subgenera: Botryanthus, Pseudomuscari, Leopoldia and Muscarimia. Pseudomuscari and Leopoldia are now treated as separate genera. The genus Muscari is now more or less equivalent to the Botryanthus group.

A complication in splitting up the broad genus is that Miller's original Muscari included representatives of at least three of the new genera. Which one should retain the name Muscari would normally be decided by where the type species was placed; however, Miller did not designate a type species, although the etymology of the genus name points to the species Linnaeus called Hyacinthus muscari (now Muscari racemosum).

The Muscarimia group are retained in Muscari by the Kew World Checklist of Selected Plant Families. Two species have been placed in this group: M. macrocarpum and M. racemosum (under the name M. muscarimi).

Species
, the World Checklist of Selected Plant Families accepts 79 species, including:

 Muscari adilii M.B.Güner & H.Duman
 Muscari albiflorum (Täckh. & Boulos) Hosni
 Muscari alpanicum Schchian
 Muscari anatolicum Cowley & Özhatay
 Muscari armeniacum Leichtlin ex Baker
 Muscari aucheri (Boiss.) Baker
 Muscari babachii Eker & Koyuncu
 Muscari baeticum Blanca
 Muscari botryoides (L.) Mill.
 Muscari bourgaei Baker
 Muscari cazorlanum C.Soriano & al.
 Muscari commutatum Guss.
 Muscari discolor Boiss. & Hausskn.
 Muscari dolichanthum Woronow & Tron 
 Muscari fertile Ravenna
 Muscari filiforme Ravenna
 Muscari hermonense Ravenna
 Muscari hierosolymitanum Ravenna
 Muscari kerkis Karlén
 Muscari kurdicum Maroofi
 Muscari latifolium J.Kirk.
 Muscari lazulinum Ravenna
 Muscari longistylum (Täckh. & Boulos) Hosni
 Muscari macbeathianum Kit Tan
 Muscari macrocarpum Sweet
 Muscari massayanum C.Grunert
 Muscari matritensis Ruíz Rejón & al.
 Muscari microstomum P.H.Davis & D.C.Stuart
 Muscari mirum Speta
 Muscari neglectum Guss. ex Ten. [syn. Muscari racemosum (L.) Medik. nom. illeg.]
 Muscari olivetorum Blanca
 Muscari parviflorum Desf.
 Muscari pulchellum Heldr. & Sart.
 Muscari racemosum Mill. [syn. Muscari muscarimi Medik. nom. illeg., Muscarimia muscari (L.) Losinsk., Muscari moschatum Willd.]
 Muscari salah-eidii (Täckh. & Boulos) Hosni
 Muscari sandrasicum Karlén
 Muscari sivrihisardaghlarensis Yild. & B.Selvi
 Muscari spreizenhoferi (Heldr. ex Osterm.) H.R.Wehrh.
 Muscari stenanthum Freyn
 Muscari tavoricum Ravenna
 Muscari turcicum Uysal et al.
 Muscari vuralii Bagci & Dogu

The names of some of the species are somewhat confused, especially in the horticultural literature. Thus the name M. racemosum is commonly found as an incorrect synonym for M. neglectum, with M. muscarimi or M. moschatum being used for the true M. racemosum. Muscari fatmacereniae was recently described from Turkey.

Species now allocated to other genera 
 Muscari azureum Fenzl, see Pseudomuscari azureum (Fenzl) Garbari & Greuter
 Muscari comosum (L.) Mill., see Leopoldia comosa (L.) Parl.
 Muscari paradoxum (Fisch. & C.A.Mey.) K.Koch, see Bellevalia paradoxa (Fisch. & C.A.Mey.) Boiss.

Cultivation
Some species are among the earliest garden flowers to bloom in the spring. They are planted as bulbs and tend to multiply quickly (naturalise) when planted in good soils. They prefer well drained sandy soil, that is acid to neutral and not too rich. Naturally found in woodlands or meadows, they are commonly cultivated in lawns, borders, rock gardens and containers. They require little feeding or watering in the summer, and sun or light shade.

The UK National Collection of Muscari is held by Richard Hobbs at his Witton Lane garden in Little Plumstead, Norfolk, which he shares with his partner Sally Ward.

Cultivars
 M. 'Pink Surprise' was described as "new" in 2011; it has pale pink flowers – a previously unknown colour in the genus – on  stems.

References

External links

 M. Philippo, Muscaripages
 Rainy Side Gardeners Muscari botryoides
 The Plant Expert

 
Asparagaceae genera
Flora of Europe
Flora of temperate Asia
Garden plants of Asia
Garden plants of Europe
Taxa named by Philip Miller